is a Japanese manga artist known for the manga Over Drive, and since 2013 for the manga DAYS for which he won the prize for best shōnen manga at the 40th Kodansha Manga Awards in 2016. He previously worked as an assistant under Taro Sekiguchi on the manga serial Wild Baseballers.

Works 
Fire & Ice
Isshun no Kaze ni Nare
Over Drive
Kuroneko Dance
Days
InspiRED (collaboration manga between Kodansha and Liverpool FC)

References

External links 
 

Manga artists
1980 births
Living people
Winner of Kodansha Manga Award (Shōnen)